This is a list of the mammal species present in Saudi Arabia. There are 78 mammal species in Saudi Arabia, of which three are critically endangered, three are endangered, nine are vulnerable, and two are near threatened.

The following tags are used to highlight each species' conservation status as assessed by the International Union for Conservation of Nature:

Order: Hyracoidea (hyraxes) 

The hyraxes are any of four species of fairly small, thickset, herbivorous mammals in the order Hyracoidea. About the size of a domestic cat they are well-furred, with rounded bodies and a stumpy tail. They are native to Africa and the Middle East.

Family: Procaviidae (hyraxes)
Genus: Procavia
 Cape hyrax, P. capensis

Order: Sirenia (manatees and dugongs) 

Sirenia is an order of fully aquatic, herbivorous mammals that inhabit rivers, estuaries, coastal marine waters, swamps, and marine wetlands. All four species are endangered.

Family: Dugongidae
Genus: Dugong
 Dugong, D. dugon

Order: Primates 

The order Primates contains humans and their closest relatives: lemurs, lorisoids, monkeys, and apes.

Suborder: Haplorhini
Infraorder: Simiiformes
Parvorder: Catarrhini
Superfamily: Cercopithecoidea
Family: Cercopithecidae (Old World monkeys)
Genus: Papio
 Hamadryas baboon, P. hamadryas

Order: Rodentia (rodents) 

Rodents make up the largest order of mammals, with over 40% of mammalian species. They have two incisors in the upper and lower jaw which grow continually and must be kept short by gnawing.

Suborder: Hystricognathi
Family: Hystricidae (Old World porcupines)
Genus: Hystrix
 Indian porcupine, H. indica 
Suborder: Sciurognathi
Family: Gliridae (dormice)
Subfamily: Leithiinae
Genus: Eliomys
 Asian garden dormouse, E. melanurus 
Family: Dipodidae (jerboas)
Subfamily: Allactaginae
Genus: Allactaga
 Euphrates jerboa, Allactaga euphratica LC
Subfamily: Dipodinae
Genus: Jaculus
 Lesser Egyptian jerboa, Jaculus jaculus LC
 Greater Egyptian jerboa, Jaculus orientalis LC
Family: Muridae (mice, rats, voles, gerbils, hamsters, etc.)
Subfamily: Deomyinae
Genus: Acomys
 Cairo spiny mouse, Acomys cahirinus LC
 Golden spiny mouse, Acomys russatus LC
Subfamily: Gerbillinae
Genus: Gerbillus
 Cheesman's gerbil, Gerbillus cheesmani LC
 Wagner's gerbil, Gerbillus dasyurus LC
 Pygmy gerbil, Gerbillus henleyi LC
 Balochistan gerbil, Gerbillus nanus LC
 Large Aden gerbil, Gerbillus poecilops LC
Genus: Meriones
 Arabian jird, Meriones arimalius EN
 Sundevall's jird, Meriones crassus LC
 Libyan jird, Meriones libycus LC
 King jird, Meriones rex LC
Genus: Psammomys
 Sand rat, Psammomys obesus LC
Genus: Sekeetamys
 Bushy-tailed jird, Sekeetamys calurus LC
Subfamily: Murinae
Genus: Apodemus
 Broad-toothed field mouse, Apodemus mystacinus LC
Genus: Arvicanthis
 African grass rat, Arvicanthis niloticus LC
Genus: Myomyscus
 Yemeni mouse, Myomys yemeni LC
Genus: Nesokia
 Short-tailed bandicoot rat, Nesokia indica LC

Order: Erinaceomorpha (hedgehogs and gymnures) 

The order Erinaceomorpha contains a single family, Erinaceidae, which comprise the hedgehogs and gymnures. The hedgehogs are easily recognised by their spines, while gymnures look more like large rats.

Family: Erinaceidae (hedgehogs)
Subfamily: Erinaceinae
Genus: Paraechinus
 Desert hedgehog, P. aethiopicus

Order: Chiroptera (bats) 

The bats' most distinguishing feature is that their forelimbs are developed as wings, making them the only mammals capable of flight. Bat species account for about 20% of all mammals.
Family: Pteropodidae (flying foxes, Old World fruit bats)
Subfamily: Pteropodinae
Genus: Eidolon
 Straw-coloured fruit bat, E. helvum NT
Genus: Rousettus
 Egyptian fruit bat, Rousettus aegyptiacus LC
Family: Vespertilionidae
Subfamily: Myotinae
Genus: Myotis
Geoffroy's bat, M. emarginatus 
Subfamily: Vespertilioninae
Genus: Eptesicus
 Botta's serotine, Eptesicus bottae LC
Genus: Hypsugo
 Bodenheimer's pipistrelle, Hypsugo bodenheimeri LC
Genus: Nycticeinops
 Schlieffen's twilight bat, Nycticeinops schlieffeni LC
Genus: Otonycteris
 Desert long-eared bat, Otonycteris hemprichii LC
Genus: Pipistrellus
 Kuhl's pipistrelle, Pipistrellus kuhlii LC
Genus: Plecotus
 Grey long-eared bat, Plecotus austriacus LC
Genus: Rhyneptesicus
Sind bat, R. nasutus 
Subfamily: Miniopterinae
Genus: Miniopterus
Common bent-wing bat, M. schreibersii 
Family: Rhinopomatidae
Genus: Rhinopoma
 Egyptian mouse-tailed bat, R. cystops 
 Lesser mouse-tailed bat, Rhinopoma hardwickei LC
 Greater mouse-tailed bat, Rhinopoma microphyllum LC
Family: Molossidae
Genus: Chaerephon
 Nigerian free-tailed bat, Chaerephon nigeriae LC
Genus: Mops
 Midas free-tailed bat, Mops midas LC
Genus: Tadarida
 Egyptian free-tailed bat, Tadarida aegyptiaca LC
 European free-tailed bat, Tadarida teniotis LC
Family: Emballonuridae
Genus: Taphozous
 Egyptian tomb bat, Taphozous perforatus LC
Family: Nycteridae
Genus: Nycteris
 Egyptian slit-faced bat, Nycteris thebaica LC
Family: Rhinolophidae
Subfamily: Rhinolophinae
Genus: Rhinolophus
 Geoffroy's horseshoe bat, Rhinolophus clivosus LC
Greater horseshoe bat, R. ferrumequinum 
Lesser horseshoe bat, R. hipposideros 
Subfamily: Hipposiderinae
Genus: Asellia
 Patrizi's trident leaf-nosed bat, Asellia patrizii VU
 Trident leaf-nosed bat, Asellia tridens LC
Genus: Hipposideros
 Ethiopian large-eared roundleaf bat, Hipposideros megalotis NT

Order: Cetacea (whales) 

The order Cetacea includes whales, dolphins and porpoises. They are the mammals most fully adapted to aquatic life with a spindle-shaped nearly hairless body, protected by a thick layer of blubber, and forelimbs and tail modified to provide propulsion underwater.

Suborder: Mysticeti
Family: Balaenopteridae
Subfamily: Balaenopterinae
Genus: Balaenoptera
 Fin whale, Balaenoptera physalus EN
 Sei whale, Balaenoptera borealis EN
 Bryde's whale, Balaenoptera edeni DD
 Minke whale, Balaenoptera acutorostrata nt
Subfamily: Megapterinae
Genus: Megaptera
 Humpback whale, Megaptera novaeangliae CR (Arabian Sea population)
Suborder: Odontoceti
Superfamily: Platanistoidea
Family: Phocoenidae
Genus: Neophocaena
 Finless porpoise, Neophocaena phocaenoides DD
Family: Kogiidae
Genus: Kogia
 Dwarf sperm whale, Kogia sima LR/lc
Family: Ziphiidae
Subfamily: Hyperoodontinae
Genus: Indopacetus
 Longman's beaked whale, Indopacetus pacificus DD
Family: Delphinidae (marine dolphins)
Genus: Steno
 Rough-toothed dolphin, Steno bredanensis LR/lc
Genus: Tursiops
 Indo-Pacific bottlenose dolphin, Tursiops aduncus DD
 Common bottlenose dolphin, Tursiops truncatus LR/lc
Genus: Sousa
 Indo-Pacific humpbacked dolphin, Sousa chinensis DD
Genus: Stenella
 Pantropical spotted dolphin, Stenella attenuata LR/cd
 Striped dolphin, Stenella cueruleoalba LR/lc
 Spinner dolphin, Stenella longirostris LR/cd
Genus: Delphinus
 Common dolphin, Delphinus capensis LR/lc
Genus: Grampus
 Risso's dolphin, Grampus griseus DD
Genus: Feresa
 Pygmy killer whale, Feresa attenuata DD
Genus: Pseudorca
 False killer whale, Pseudorca crassidens DD

Order: Carnivora (carnivorans) 

There are over 260 species of carnivorans, the majority of which eat meat as their primary dietary item. They have a characteristic skull shape and dentition.
Suborder: Feliformia
Family: Felidae (cats)
Subfamily: Felinae
Genus: Caracal
Caracal, C. caracal 
Genus: Felis
African wildcat, F. lybica 
Sand cat, F. margarita 
Subfamily: Pantherinae
Genus: Panthera
Leopard, P. pardus 
 Arabian leopard, P. p. nimr 
Family: Viverridae
Genus: Genetta
Common genet, G. genetta 
Family: Herpestidae (mongooses)
Subfamily: Herpestinae
Genus: Urva
Indian grey mongoose, U. edwardsii 
Genus: Ichneumia
White-tailed mongoose, I. albacauda  
Family: Hyaenidae (hyaenas)
Genus: Hyaena
Striped hyena, H. hyaena 
Suborder: Caniformia
Family: Canidae (dogs, foxes)
Genus: Canis
Golden jackal, C. aureus 
Gray wolf, C. lupus 
 Arabian wolf, C. l. arabs 
Genus: Vulpes
Blanford's fox, V. cana 
Rüppell's fox, V. rueppellii 
Red fox, V. vulpes 
Family: Mustelidae (mustelids)
Genus: Mellivora
Honey badger, M. capensis

Order: Artiodactyla (even-toed ungulates) 

The even-toed ungulates are ungulates whose weight is borne about equally by the third and fourth toes, rather than mostly or entirely by the third as in perissodactyls. There are about 220 artiodactyl species, including many that are of great economic importance to humans.
Family: Bovidae (cattle, antelope, sheep, goats)
Subfamily: Antilopinae
Genus: Gazella
 Arabian gazelle, G. arabica 
Arabian sand gazelle, G. marica 
Subfamily: Caprinae
Genus: Capra
Nubian ibex, C. nubiana 
Subfamily: Hippotraginae
Genus: Oryx
Arabian oryx, O. leucoryx reintroduced

Locally extinct 
The following species are locally extinct in the country:
 Cheetah, Acinonyx jubatus
 Onager, Equus hemionus
Saudi gazelle, Gazella saudiya
 Lion, Panthera leo

See also
List of chordate orders
Lists of mammals by region
Mammal classification
Wildlife of Saudi Arabia

References

External links

Lists of mammals by country
Lists of mammals of the Middle East
mammals

mammals